This is a list of people in blockchain technology, people who do work in the area of Blockchain and Cryptocurrency, in particular researchers, business people and authors.

Some persons notable as programmers are included here because they work in research as well as programming. A few of these people pre-date the invention of this technology; they are now regarded as people in blockchain technology because their work can be seen as leading to the invention of this technology.

A

 Gavin Andresen, former Bitcoin lead developer
 Andreas Antonopoulos, author of Mastering Bitcoin
 Jeremy Allaire, CEO and founder of the digital currency company Circle and Chairman of the Board of Brightcove

B

 Brian Behlendorf, Executive Director of Hyperledger Project
 Brendan Blumer, CEO of Block.One
 Vitalik Buterin, founder of Ethereum
 Adam Back, author of Hashcash and CEO of Blockstream

C

 Wences Casares, CEO of Xapo
 David Chaum, computer scientist, cryptographer and blockchain pioneer.

D

 Wei Dai, creator of b-money; inspired the creation of Bitcoin by Satoshi Nakamoto

F

 Hal Finney, the recipient of the first Bitcoin transaction

G

 Tony Gallippi, founder of BitPay, a global bitcoin payment service provider headquartered in Atlanta, Georgia

H

 Charles Hoskinson, co founder of Ethereum and founder of Cardano

I
 Ruja Ignatova, founder of OneCoin, a pyramid scheme promoted as a cryptocurrency.

K
 Dave Kleiman associated with Craig Wright
Kofi Genfi, co-founder of Mazzuma

L

 Chris Larsen, CEO of Ripple
 Brad Garlinghouse, CEO of Ripple Labs

M

 Blythe Masters, CEO of Digital Asset Holdings

N

 Satoshi Nakamoto, the name used by the unknown person or people who designed bitcoin and created its original reference implementation
Nii Osae Osae Dade, co-founder of Mazzuma

S

 Emin Gün Sirer, professor at Cornell University, dedicated to building and studying distributed and peer-to-peer systems
 Jorge Stolfi, Brazilian professor at the University of Campinas, cryptocurrency skeptic
 Nick Szabo, computer scientist, cryptographer and legal scholar, known for his research in digital contracts and digital currency.

T

 Alex Tapscott, co-author of Blockchain Revolution, CEO and founder of Northwest Passage Ventures, an advisory firm for early-stage blockchain companies
 Don Tapscott, co-author of Blockchain Revolution, CEO of Tapscott Group, co-founder of Blockchain Research Institute

V

Roger Ver, Bitcoin Foundation co-founder, promoter of Bitcoin Cash

W

 Zooko Wilcox-O'Hearn, creator of cryptocoin Zcash
 Gavin Wood, co-founder of Ethereum
 Jihan Wu, co-founder of Bitmain

Z

 Micree Zhan, co-founder of Bitmain
 Changpeng Zhao, founder of exchange Binance

See also

 Blockchain
 Bitcoin
 List of bitcoin companies

References

Blockchain